P'yŏngsŏng station is a railway station in Yŏkchŏn-dong, P'yŏngsong city, South P'yŏngan Province, North Korea. It is located on the P'yŏngra Line of the Korean State Railway.

References

Railway stations in North Korea